Lone Wolf Multiplayer Game Book is a role-playing game published by Mongoose Publishing in 2010.

Description
Lone Wolf Multiplayer Game Book is based on the Lone Wolf series of gamebooks.

Publication history
Lone Wolf Multiplayer Game Book was published by Mongoose Publishing in 2010.

Reception

References

British role-playing games
Fantasy role-playing games
Lone Wolf (gamebooks)
Mongoose Publishing games
Role-playing games based on novels
Role-playing games introduced in 2010